Hoplolythra, erected as a moth genus by George Hampson in 1910, is now considered a synonym of Cirrhophanus Grote, 1872 by Butterflies and Moths of the World or of Eulithosia H. Edwards, 1884 by Lepidoptera and Some Other Life Forms.

Former species
 Hoplolythra arivaca is now Hoplolythrodes arivaca Barnes, 1907
 Hoplolythra discistriga is now Eulithosia discistriga J. B. Smith, 1903

References

Acronictinae